The following is a timeline of tabletop role-playing games. For computer role-playing games see here.

The publication year listed here is the year of the first edition in the original country. Additional editions, translations or adaptations for use in other countries are not included in this list. For editions other than the first, consult the corresponding article.

Some games started out as generic role-playing supplements, supplements for other games, or even a different kind of game. Those games are listed in the year when they made the transition to a standalone role-playing game.

Unique games with identical or similar titles are listed separately. Unique means games that use different rules or settings but does not include rule revisions by the same author or publisher.

1970s

1974 
 Dungeons & Dragons
 Rules to the Game of DUNGEON

1975 
 Boot Hill 
 Empire of the Petal Throne
 En Garde! 
 Tunnels & Trolls

1976 
 Bunnies & Burrows 
 Knights of the Round Table 
 Metamorphosis Alpha 
 Monsters! Monsters!
 Starfaring

1977 
 Chivalry & Sorcery
 Flash Gordon & the Warriors of Mongo
 The Realm of Yolmi 
 Space Patrol, later renamed Star Patrol
 Space Quest 
 Superhero: 2044 
 Traveller

1978 
 Advanced Dungeons & Dragons
 Bifrost
 The Complete Warlock
 Gamma World
 High Fantasy
 John Carter, Warlord of Mars
 Legacy
 RuneQuest
 Starships & Spacemen
 Star Trek: Adventure Gaming in the Final Frontier
 What Price Glory?!

1979 
 Adventures in Fantasy
 Buccaneer
 Bushido 
 Commando 
 Gangster!
 Heroes
 Ironhedge
 Villains and Vigilantes
 Ysgarth

1980s

1980 
 Archaeron
 Basic Role-Playing
 Beasts, Men & Gods
 Castle Perilous
 Dallas
 DragonQuest
 The Fantasy Trip
 Land of the Rising Sun 
 Melanda
 The Morrow Project
 Odysseus
 Skull and Crossbones
 Space Opera
 Supergame
 Thieves' Guild
 Top Secret

1981 
 Aftermath!
 Arduin
 Call of Cthulhu
 Champions
 Crimefighters
 Fantasy Wargaming
 Heroes of Olympus
 The Mechanoid Invasion
 Merc
 Midgard (German RPG)
 The Spawn of Fashan
 Star Rovers 
 Stormbringer
 Universe
 Wild West
 Wizards' Realm

1982 
 Alma Mater
 Behind Enemy Lines by FASA
 Daredevils
 Drakar och Demoner (Trudvang Chronicles)
 Fringeworthy
 FTL:2448
 Gangbusters
 Inner City
 Knights and Berserkers and Legerdemain 
  Man, Myth and Magic
 Middle-earth Role Playing
 Pirates and Plunder
 Recon
 Rolemaster 
 Space Infantry
 Starfleet Voyages
 Star Frontiers
 Star Trek: The Role Playing Game
 Swordbearer
 Worlds of Wonder

1983 
 Droids 
 Element Masters
 Espionage!, later renamed Danger International
 James Bond 007
 Lands of Adventure
 Légendes (French RPG)
 Lords of Creation
 L'Ultime Épreuve (French RPG)
 Mach: The First Colony
 Mercenaries, Spies and Private Eyes
 Other Suns by FGU
 Palladium Fantasy Role-Playing Game
 Powers and Perils 
 Privateers and Gentlemen
 Stalking the Night Fantastic 
 Star Quest 
 Super Squadron
 Superworld
 Timeship
 To Challenge Tomorrow
 The Valley of the Pharaohs 
 Victorian Adventure
 Warhammer The Mass Combat Fantasy Role-Playing Game
 Witch Hunt by StatCom Simulations

1984 
 The Adventures of Indiana Jones
 The Atlantean Trilogy (also known as The Arcanum)
 Chill
 Das Schwarze Auge (The Dark Eye) 
 DragonRaid
 Elfquest
 Fighting Fantasy - The Introductory Role-Playing Game
 Flashing Blades
 Golden Heroes
 Heroes Unlimited
 Justice, Inc.
 Kata Kumbas
 Maelstrom
 Marvel Super Heroes
 Mega (French RPG)
 Mutant
 Paranoia
 Phantasy Conclave
 Psi World
 Ringworld
 Skyrealms of Jorune
 Star Ace
 Swords & Glory
 Time & Time Again
 Timemaster
 Toon
 Twilight 2000

1985 
 Challengers
 Conan Role-Playing Game
 DC Heroes
 Dinky Dungeons
 The Doctor Who Role Playing Game
 Dragon Warriors
 Dragonroar
 Fantasy Hero
 Hawkmoon
 Hidden Kingdom
 Judge Dredd: The Role-Playing Game
 Maléfices
 Mekton
 Midnight at the Well of Souls Role-Playing System
 Pendragon
 Sandman - Map of Halaal
 Space Master
 Teenage Mutant Ninja Turtles & Other Strangeness

1986 
 2300 AD
 9th Generation 
 Arena
 By the Gods
 The Challenges Game System 
 Delta Force: America Strikes Back!
 Eternal Soldier
 Ghostbusters
 Freedom Fighters
 GURPS
 HârnMaster
 Hunter Planet: The All Australian Role Playing Game 
 MechWarrior
 Mythworld
 Phoenix Command
 The Price of Freedom 
 Robotech
 Robot Warriors 
 Warhammer Fantasy Roleplay
 Year of the Phoenix

1987 
 Ars Magica
 Beyond the Supernatural
 Cyborg Commando
 Enforcers
 Expendables
 Future Worlds
 Living Steel
 MEGA Role-Playing System
 Miekka ja magia
 Night of the Ninja
 Ninjas & Superspies 
 Star Wars: The Roleplaying Game by West End Games
 Talislanta
 Teenagers from Outer Space
 Robotech II: The Sentinels
 Timelords
 TWERPS

1988 
 Animonde
 Albedo 
 Bullwinkle and Rocky Role-Playing Party Game
 Cyberpunk 2013
 High Colonies
 Justifiers RPG
 Macho Women with Guns
 Manhunter 
 Phantasia
 Second Dawn
 Space: 1889
 SpaceTime
 Woof Meow

1989 
 Advanced Fighting Fantasy 
 Adventurers of the North - Kalevala Heroes
 Batman Role-Playing Game
 Blackwatch
 The Confederate Rangers
 Cyberspace
 In Nomine Satanis/Magna Veritas
 It Came From the Late, Late, Late Show
 Lace & Steel
 Mutazoids
 Omnigon
 Prince Valiant: The Story-Telling Game
 Shadowrun
 Star Hero 
 Sword World RPG

1990s

1990 
 Age of Ruin by Cutting Edge Games
 Aquelarre (Spanish RPG)
 Attack of the Humans
 Battlelords of the 23rd Century
 Buck Rogers XXVC
 Cadillacs and Dinosaurs
 CORPS
 Fifth Cycle
 Hero System
 Morpheus
 Nightlife
 Reich Star
 Rifts
 Ruf des Warlock (German RPG)
 Torg
 Worlds Beyond

1991 
 Amber Diceless Roleplaying Game
 Aliens Adventure Game
 Dark Conspiracy
 Kult
 Lord of the Rings Adventure Game
 Lost Souls
 Millennium's End
 Tales from the Floating Vagabond
 Time Lord: Adventures through Time and Space
 Vampire: The Masquerade
 Warp World
 The World of Synnibarr

1992 
 Dangerous Journeys 
 Dream Park: The Roleplaying Game 
 Duel by Nightshift Games 
 Fanhunter, el juego de rol épicodecadente
 Fudge
 Fuzzy Heroes by Inner City Games Designs
 Nephilim
 Over the Edge
 Werewolf: The Apocalypse

1993 
 Amazing Engine
 The Beast Within 
 Earthdawn
 Fate of the Norns
 Forgotten Futures
 High Adventure Cliffhangers Buck Rogers Adventure Game 
 Kryształy Czasu 
 Macross II: The Role-Playing Game
 Mage: The Ascension
 Manhunter
 Mutant Chronicles
 Nexus: The Infinite City
 Pandemonium!
 Prime Directive
 Risus
 Shatterzone
 SLA Industries
 Space Gothic (German RPG)
 Theatrix (role-playing game)
 Underground
 The Whispering Vault

1994 
 3D&T
 Aria: Canticle of the Monomyth
 Castle Falkenstein
 Don't Look Back 
 Gardásiyal: Adventures on Tékumel 
 GateWar by Escape Ventures
 HoL
 Immortal: The Invisible War
 Inferno by Death's Edge Games
 Masterbook
 Street Fighter: The Storytelling Game
 The World of Bloodshadows
 The World of Indiana Jones
 Wraith: The Oblivion

1995 
 Changeling: The Dreaming
 Cybergeneration
 The End by Scapegoat Games
 Everway 
 Heavy Gear
 Nightbane
 Project A-ko
 The World of Necroscope
 The World of Tank Girl

1996 
 Blood Dawn
 Bubblegum Crisis
 CJ Carella's WitchCraft
 Conspiracy X
 The D6 System: The Customizable Roleplaying Game
 Deadlands
 Dragonlance: Fifth Age
 Fading Suns
 Feng Shui
 Gatecrasher
 Hong Kong Action Theatre!
 Infinite Domains by Infinite Concepts
 Fritz Leiber's Lankhmar: The New Adventures of Fafhrd and Gray Mouser
 Vampire: The Dark Ages
 The World of Tales from the Crypt

1997 
 Æon/Trinity
 Armageddon: The End Times
 Armored Trooper Votoms
 Big Eyes, Small Mouth
 Blue Planet
 Champions: New Millennium
 Dzikie Pola (Polish RPG)
 Fuzion
 In Nomine
 Jovian Chronicles
 Legend of the Five Rings
 Men in Black
 Multiverser
 Neverwhere by Postmortem Studios
 Puppetland
 Usagi Yojimbo Roleplaying Game
 Werewolf: The Wild West

1998 
 Alternity
 Blood of Heroes
 Deadlands: Hell on Earth
 The Extraordinary Adventures of Baron Munchausen
 Hercules & Xena
 Mage: The Sorcerer's Crusade
 Marvel Super Heroes Adventure Game
 QAGS
 Runeslayers
 Star Trek: The Next Generation Role-playing Game 
 Tribe 8 
 Tribes by Steve Jackson Games
 Unknown Armies

1999 

 7th Sea
 Aberrant
 Agone (French RPG)
 All Flesh Must Be Eaten
 Brave New World
 Continuum 
 DC Universe Roleplaying Game
 Dominion Rules (online)
 Dragon Ball Z: The Anime Adventure Game
 Furry Pirates
 Hunter: The Reckoning
 Lejendary Adventure
 Nobilis
 Powerkill
 Star Trek: Deep Space Nine Role Playing Game
 Star Trek: The Original Series Role-playing Game
 Violence
 Weird War Two: Crusade for Europe

2000s

2000 
 Dune: Chronicles of the Imperium
 Hero Wars (later renamed HeroQuest)
 Orkworld
 Star Wars Roleplaying Game by Wizards of the Coast 
 World Tree

2001 
 Adventure!
 After the Bomb
 De Profundis
 The Dying Earth Roleplaying Game
 Exalted
 Forbidden Kingdoms
 Gear Krieg
 Godlike
 HackMaster
 Little Fears
 The Metabarons Roleplaying Game 
 Mummy: The Resurrection
 Sorcerer
 Weird War II: Blood on the Rhine
 The Wheel of Time Roleplaying Game
 The Witcher (Polish RPG)

2002 
 Active Exploits 
 Arcane Codex (German RPG)
 Buffy the Vampire Slayer Roleplaying Game
 The Burning Wheel
 Call of Cthulhu (d20) 
 Cartoon Action Hour 
 Children of the Sun 
 d20 Modern
 Demon: The Fallen
 Engel
 Discworld Roleplaying Game
 Donjon
 Dread: The First Book of Pandemonium
 EverQuest Role-Playing Game
 Farscape Roleplaying Game
 InSpectres
 The Lord of the Rings Roleplaying Game
 Mechanical Dream
 Mutants & Masterminds
 Silver Age Sentinels
 Sláine: The Roleplaying Game of Celtic Heroes 
 Spaceship Zero
 Spycraft
 Star Trek Roleplaying Game
 Terra Primate
 Steve Perrin's Quest Rules
 Transhuman Space
 Victorian Age: Vampire

2003 
 Angel Roleplaying Game
 Babylon 5 Roleplaying Game
 D6 Adventure
 Dead Inside
 Deliria
 Diana: Warrior Princess
 EABA
 F.A.T.A.L.
 FATE
 Fates Worse than Death 
 Grimm
 High Adventure Role Playing 
 Marvel Universe Roleplaying Game
 My Life With Master
 Neuroshima
 Orpheus
 Savage Worlds
 Silhouette CORE
 Sine Requie
 Stargate SG-1 Roleplaying Game
 Tri-Stat dX
 Unisystem
 Victoriana

2004 
 Castles & Crusades
 Chronicles of Darkness
 Conan: The Roleplaying Game
 Dogs in the Vineyard
 D6 Fantasy
 D6 Space
 Fireborn
 Lone Wolf: The Roleplaying Game
 Monastyr
 Paranoia XP
 Primetime Adventures
 The Shadow of Yesterday
 Tibet: The Roleplaying Game
 Vampire: The Requiem

2005 
 Anima: Beyond Fantasy (Spanish RPG)
 Army of Darkness
 Artesia: Adventures in the Known World
 Atlantis: The Second Age
 Blue Rose
 City of Heroes by Eden Games
 Dawning Star
 Dread
 Etherscope
 A Game of Thrones
 Hollyworld
 Jeremiah: The Roleplaying Game
 Mage: The Awakening
 The Mountain Witch
 Omni System
 Serenity
 Spycraft 2.0
 Starship Troopers: The Roleplaying Game
 Tékumel: Empire of the Petal Throne
 True20
 Truth & Justice
 Usagi Yojimbo by Sanguine Productions
 Werewolf: The Forsaken
 World of Warcraft: The Roleplaying Game

2006 
 Basic Fantasy 
 Big Bang Comics
 Cadwallon
 Chronicles of Ramlar
 Corporation
 Cold City
 Crystalicum
 Don't Rest Your Head
 Heroic Visions
 Hollow Earth Expedition 
 Nemesis - Roleplaying in Worlds of Horror by Arc Dream Publishing
 OSRIC 
 Promethean: The Created
 Shab-al-Hiri Roach
 Spirit of the Century
 Wild Talents
 The Zantabulous Zorcerer of Zo

2007 
 Aces & Eights: Shattered Frontier
 Battlestar Galactica Role Playing Game
 Changeling: The Lost
 The Esoterrorists
 Fear Itself
 Grey Ranks
 Labyrinth Lord
 Monte Cook's World of Darkness
 Reign
 Scion
 Star Wars Saga Edition
 Tenra War
 Witch Hunter: The Invisible World

2008 
 CthulhuTech
 Dark Heresy 
 Dead Reign 
 Demon Hunters Role Playing Game
 Ghosts of Albion by Eden Studios, Inc.
 Houses of the Blooded
 Hunter: The Vigil
 Innocents
 Hot War
 Legend of the Burning Sands
 Monsters and Other Childish Things
 Mouse Guard
 Mutant Future
 Starblazer Adventures
 Swords & Wizardry
 Trail of Cthulhu

2009 
 A Song of Ice and Fire Roleplaying
 Diaspora
 Doctor Who: Adventures in Time and Space
 Eclipse Phase
 Fantasy Craft 
 Fiasco
 Geist: The Sin-Eaters
 Mutant City Blues
 Pathfinder Roleplaying Game 
 Rogue Trader
 Supernatural: The Role Playing Game

2010s

2010 
 Apocalypse World
 Capes, Cowls & Villains Foul
 Dark Dungeons
 Dark Harvest - The Legacy of Frankenstein
 DC Adventures
 Deathwatch 
 Dragon Age
 The Dresden Files 
 Eden: l'Inganno (Italian RPG)
 Lamentations of the Flame Princess
 The Laundry
 Legends of Anglerre
 Leverage: The Roleplaying Game
 Smallville Roleplaying Game
 Stars Without Number

2011 
 Abney Park's Airship Pirates 
 Arcanis
 Ashen Stars
 Black Crusade 
 Fabled Lands
 The Kerberos Club (Fate) 
 The One Ring Roleplaying Game

2012 
 Dungeon Crawl Classics
 Dungeon World
 Iron Kingdoms
 Marvel Heroic Roleplaying
 Michtim: Fluffy Adventures
 Night's Black Agents
 Space: 1889 (Ubiquity)
 Tephra: The Steampunk RPG
 Wolsung (Polish RPG)

2013 
 13th Age
 Blueholme
 Mummy: The Curse
 Numenera

2014 
 Star Wars: Age of Rebellion 
 Atomic Robo
 Demon: The Descent
 Demonworld
 Firefly Role-Playing Game
 Splittermond (German RPG)
 The Strange

2015 
 Cypher System
 Catalyst
 Night Witches
 Shadow of the Demon Lord

2016 
 Adventures in Middle-earth
 Beast: The Primordial
 Bubblegumshoe
 Degenesis
 Delta Green
 No Thank You, Evil!

2017 
 Blades in the Dark
 City of Mist by Son of Oak Game Studio
 Conan: Adventures in an Age Undreamed Of
 Paranoia: Red Clearance Edition
 Starfinder Roleplaying Game 
 Tales from the Loop by Free League Publishing
 Vurt
 Zweihänder

2018 
 John Carter of Mars by Modiphius
 Tails of Equestria by River Horse
Suzerain Legends by Savage Mojo
 The Witcher by R. Talsorian Games

2019 
 Alien by Free League Publishing
 Never Going Home by Wet Ink Games
 Pathfinder Second Edition by Paizo
 Quest by The Adventure Guild

2020s

2020 
 Burn Bryte by Roll20
 Cyberpunk RED by R. Talsorian Games
 Depués d'Ochobre by Ediciones Radagast
 SLA Industries: 2nd Edition by Nightfall Games
 Vaesen by Free League Publishing

2021 
 Fallout: The Roleplaying Game by Modiphius
 Shadow of Mogg by Manic Productions

Sources 
 Darkshire, in English
 RPGGeek, in English
 Le Grog, in French
 PSNROL, in Spanish (archived)
 DRoSI, in German
 Martinolli, Pascal. 2019. « TTTTRPG: Timeline Tree of Tabletop Role-Playing Games, celebrating more than 40 years of game design innovations » Dataset and dot language code.

See also 

 History of role-playing games
 List of role-playing games, restricted to notable games.
 List of role-playing game designers, including a short list of games to which each designer made a significant contribution.
 List of role-playing game publishers
 List of game manufacturers

 
Tabletop role-playing games
Lists about role-playing games